Wyoming Highway 259 (WYO 259) is an  north-south state highway located in northeastern Natrona County, north of Casper, in the east-central part of the U.S. state of Wyoming. The highway is the former routing of U.S. Route 87, after that highway was relocated onto Interstate 25.

Route description
Wyoming Highway 259 begins its southern end at an interchange with I-25/US 87 (Exit 210). Highway 259 heads north  to the Town of Midwest just east of the Town of Edgerton. Here WYO 259 comes to an end at Wyoming Highway 387 near the Salt Creek Oil Field. Highway 259 is the fastest route for travelers between Casper and Midwest.

History
Wyoming Highway 259 is the former routing of U.S. Route 87 prior to relocation along Interstate 25.

Major intersections

References

Official 2003 State Highway Map of Wyoming

External links 

Wyoming State Routes 200-299
WYO 259 - I-25/US 87 to WYO 387
Midwest, WY official website

Transportation in Natrona County, Wyoming
259
U.S. Route 87